Jed Brown (born 12 March 1991) is a New Zealand rugby union player who currently plays as a flanker for  in Super Rugby.

Early career

Born and raised in Christchurch, Brown attended and played first XV rugby for Burnside High School in the city's western suburbs. After graduation, he played club rugby for Burnside whilst being a member of the  Academy and representing the province at Colts level.

Senior career

Although not named in Canterbury's official squad for the 2012 ITM Cup, Brown managed to make 3 appearances as a replacement as the men from Christchurch lifted that year's Premiership title. Injuries hindered him through 2014 and 2015 and he only made 8 appearances across the 2 seasons, winning his 3rd Premiership crown in 2015 while 2016 saw him play a career high 10 games as Canterbury lifted the Premiership title for the 8th time in 9 years.

Super Rugby

Brown was named in the  wider training group for the first time in 2014 and remained there in 2015, however owing to the depth of loose forwards available to the Crusaders, he was unable to get on the field.   He was promoted to the senior Crusaders squad for the 2016 Super Rugby season, but an injury sustained during the 2015 ITM Cup meant that he had to sit out the season.   Despite this, new Crusaders head coach, Scott Robertson, retained Brown in the squad for 2017.

Career Honours

Canterbury

National Provincial Championship - 2012, 2013, 2015, 2016

References

1991 births
New Zealand rugby union players
Canterbury rugby union players
Rugby union flankers
People educated at Burnside High School
Living people
Rugby union players from Christchurch
Crusaders (rugby union) players
Tasman rugby union players
Blues (Super Rugby) players
Hanazono Kintetsu Liners players